General elections were held in Zambia on 26 October 1988. At the time, the country was a one-party state with the United National Independence Party (UNIP) as the sole legal party. UNIP leader Kenneth Kaunda was automatically re-elected for a sixth five-year term as President with 95.5% of the vote, whilst UNIP also won all 125 seats in the National Assembly. Voter turnout was around 60% in the parliamentary elections, but 58.8% in the presidential elections.

Two years later UNIP was forced to give up its monopoly of power as part of an agreement with the opposition. The next elections had been scheduled for 1993, but snap elections were called in 1991 as a result of the agreement.

Campaign
Prior to the elections, primary elections were held to elect candidates for the 125 constituencies. Only UNIP members could vote in the primaries, and the top three candidates would be able to stand for the National Assembly election. In total, 706 people stood for election to the National Assembly, of which 612 were approved by the UNIP central committee.

Results

President
Kaunda was the sole candidate for president, and voters voted yes or no to his candidacy.

National Assembly

Aftermath
Following protests, riots and an attempted coup in 1990, the constitution was amended to allow other parties to challenge UNIP in the 1991 elections.

See also
List of members of the National Assembly of Zambia (1988–91)

References

Zambia
General
Elections in Zambia
One-party elections
Presidential elections in Zambia
Election and referendum articles with incomplete results